Benjamin Collier (born 19 June 1984) is a New Zealand field hockey player who competed in the 2008 Summer Olympics.

References

External links
 

1984 births
Living people
New Zealand male field hockey players
Olympic field hockey players of New Zealand
Field hockey players at the 2008 Summer Olympics
Field hockey players at the 2006 Commonwealth Games
Commonwealth Games competitors for New Zealand
21st-century New Zealand people